Mujeres engañadas (English: Deceived Women) is a Mexican telenovela produced by Emilio Larrosa for Televisa in 1999-2000. The telenovela tells the story of four couples who live in the same apartment building.

On Monday, October 25, 1999, Canal de las Estrellas started broadcasting Mujeres engañadas weekdays at 9:00pm, replacing Infierno en el paraíso. The last episode was broadcast on Friday, April 7, 2000 with La casa en la playa replacing it the following Monday.

Laura León, Andrés García, Sabine Moussier, Arturo Peniche, Michelle Vieth, Kuno Becker and the leading actors Elsa Aguirre and Eric del Castillo starred as protagonists, while Susana González, Victor Noriega, Diana Golden and the leading actor Raymundo Capetillo starred as antagonists.

Plot
Mujeres engañadas tells the story of four couples that live in the same building, within which lies and infidelity are the principal relationship and family problems that confront those involved.

The first couple are Yolanda and Javier Duarte (Laura León and Andrés García). Yolanda is a woman of humble origins who married Javier, a rich man who has two teenage daughters, María Rosa (Marisol Mijares) and Jessica (Anahí). Javier cheated on his wife, Yolanda, with a lady named Monica Romero. Javier also has an illegitimate son named Javierito with Monica.

The second couple is composed of Diana and Alejandro Lizárraga (Sabine Moussier) and Arturo Peniche). Diana is a vain and selfish woman who is obsessed with finding the secret of eternal youth. Alejandro, on the other hand, is a decent and honest man who dreams of having a child with his wife. Diana cheats on Alejandro with Pablo Rentería. When Alejandro discovers his Diana's infidelity with Pablo, he plans to get revenge on Pablo.

Paola Montero (Michelle Vieth) and César Martínez (Kuno Becker) are a young couple. Paola is very religious and lives in Veracruz, while César is an attractive young man whose greatest pleasure is to conquer women. César sleeps Maru and an angry Paola blames Maru for being intimate with César.

The fourth couple is Cecilia and Jorge Martínez (Elsa Aguirre and Eric del Castillo), César's parents, who have been married for thirty years and whose relationship has fallen into routine. Jorge cheats on his wife with a young woman named Ivette del Sagrario Campuzano del Castillo.

Cast
 
Laura León as Yolanda Jiménez de Duarte
Andrés García as Javier Duarte Cortés
Arturo Peniche as Alejandro Lizárraga
Sabine Moussier as Diana Fernández de Lizárraga
Michelle Vieth as Paola Montero
Kuno Becker as César Martínez Onderain
Eric del Castillo as Jorge Martínez
Elsa Aguirre as Cecilia Onderain de Martínez
Diana Golden as Mónica Romero
Susana González as Ivette del Sagrario Campuzano
Juan Peláez as Jefe
Carlos Bracho as Lic. Ernesto Sierra
Anahí as Jessica Duarte Jiménez
José María Torre as Ricardo Hernández Chávez
Marisol Mijares as María Rosa Duarte Jiménez
Carlos Bonavides as Maclovio Hernández
Maribel Fernández as Concepción "Concha" Chávez de Hernández
Jorge De Silva as Raúl
Víctor Noriega as Pablo Rentería
Raymundo Capetillo as Ramiro Cifuentes
Joana Benedek as Johanna Sierra
Irina Areu as Florinda
Ingrid Martz as Adriana Falcón
Lucy Tovar as Casilda de Montero
Andrea Becerra as Sonia Lizárraga
Alejandra Becerra as Monserrat Lizárraga
Elizabeth Arciniega as Guadalupe "Lupe" Edelmira Silis Chacón
Carla Ortiz as Marujita "Maru" Lopéz Guerra
Gustavo Negrete as Aurelio
Antonio Miguel as Liberio
Martha Roth as Catalina Cortés
Jorge Brenan as Edmundo
Antonio Brenan as Ramón
Karla Álvarez as Sonia Arteaga
Dulce as Montserrat
Marlene Favela as Leticia
Oscar Traven as Roberto Duarte Cortés
Jorge Antolín as Esteban
Tania Vázquez as Aracely
Claudia Troyo as Carolina Susana Montero
Aitor Iturrioz as Manuel
Carlos Miguel as Pastrana
Sergio Acosta as Francisco Duarte Cortés
Eduardo Rivera as Teniente José Luis Ortega
Estrella Lugo as Lucía "Lucy"
Bobby Larios as Pedro
Ramón Valdés Urtiz as Gerardo Quintero
Marco Antonio Maldonado as Javier "Javierito" Duarte Romero
Juan Romanca as Sebastián
Néstor Leoncio as Humberto Quintero
Enrique Grey as Demetrio Zamudio
Liliana Arriaga as La Chupitos
Zoila Quiñones
Ivonne Montero

Awards

References

External links

1999 telenovelas
Mexican telenovelas
1999 Mexican television series debuts
2000 Mexican television series endings
Spanish-language telenovelas
Television shows set in Mexico City
Televisa telenovelas